Daniel King (born 30 May 1983) is a British racewalker. He competed for England in the men's 20 km walk at the 2006 Commonwealth Games and at a number of World Cup events for Great Britain. He has a twin brother named Dominic who is also a racewalker.

Career
Daniel attended Coventry University. He was British number one when he was called up to the squad to compete at the 2004 IAAF World Race Walking Cup in Naumburg, Germany.

He competed for Great Britain alongside his brother at the 2006 Commonwealth Games in Melbourne, putting out a public call for sponsors before travelling. He finished in sixth place in the men's 20 km walk, one place above his brother and two places above fellow British competitor Andrew Penn.

In 2008 he was selected for the British team at that year's World Cup in Cheboksary, Russia, having set the fastest 20 km by a British athlete for six years. He donated a year's worth of trainers to an exhibition in Suffolk to mark one year prior the 2012 Summer Olympics in London.

He won the 20 km race at the Manx Harriers open day on the Isle of Man in February 2011. At the 2011 Enfield Open, Daniel placed second, with his brother coming in first. In preparation for the 2012 Games, he took a training trip to Spain with his brother in January 2012. He was also named one of Colchester's "Olympic Champions". Alongside his brother, he was named part of the British squad for the 2012 Racewalking World Cup in Saransk, Russia. He finished the race in 61st place, with a season's best time of 4:20:49.

Personal life
He has a twin brother named Dominic, who is also an racewalker.

References

1983 births
Living people
Sportspeople from Colchester
English male racewalkers
British male racewalkers
Commonwealth Games competitors for England
Athletes (track and field) at the 2006 Commonwealth Games
British Athletics Championships winners
Alumni of Coventry University